Vyacheslav Dmitriyevich Zudov (born 8 January 1942) is a retired Soviet cosmonaut.

He was selected as a cosmonaut on 23 October 1965, flew as Commander on Soyuz 23 on 14–16 October 1976 and retired on 14 May 1987.

Zudov is married and has two children.

Awards 
Hero of the Soviet Union
Pilot-Cosmonaut of the USSR
Jubilee Medal "Twenty Years of Victory in the Great Patriotic War 1941-1945"
Jubilee Medal "In Commemoration of the 100th Anniversary since the Birth of Vladimir Il'ich Lenin"
Jubilee Medal "50 Years of the Armed Forces of the USSR"
Medal "For Merit in Space Exploration" (Russian Federation)

References

1942 births
Living people
People from Bor, Nizhny Novgorod Oblast
Soviet cosmonauts
Heroes of the Soviet Union
Soviet Air Force officers
Recipients of the Order of Lenin
Recipients of the Medal "For Merit in Space Exploration"